The Honda CBR1000RR, marketed in some countries as the "Fireblade" (capitalized as FireBlade until the 2000s), is a  liquid-cooled inline four-cylinder superbike, introduced by Honda in 2004 as the 7th generation of the CBR series of motorcycles that began with the CBR900RR in 1990.

History

Racing roots
The Honda CBR1000RR was developed by the same team that was behind the MotoGP series. Many of the new technologies introduced in the Honda CBR600RR, a direct descendant of the RC211V, were used in the new CBR1000RR such as a lengthy swingarm, Unit Pro-Link rear suspension, and Dual Stage Fuel Injection System (DSFI).

2004–2005

The seventh-generation RR (SC57), the Honda CBR1000RR, was the successor to the 2002 CBR954RR. While evolving the CBR954RR design, few parts were carried over to the CBR1000RR. The compact  in-line four was a new design, with different bore and stroke dimensions, race-inspired cassette-type six-speed gearbox, all-new ECU-controlled ram-air system, dual-stage fuel injection, and center-up exhaust with a new computer-controlled butterfly valve. The chassis was likewise all-new, including an organic-style aluminum frame composed of Gravity Die-Cast main sections and Fine Die-Cast steering head structure, inverted fork, Unit Pro-Link rear suspension, radial-mounted front brakes, and a centrally located fuel tank hidden under a faux cover. Additionally, the Honda Electronic Steering Damper (HESD) debuted as an industry first system which aimed to improve stability and help eliminate head shake while automatically adjusting for high and low speed steering effort.

A longer swingarm acted as a longer lever arm in the rear suspension for superior traction under acceleration and more progressive suspension action. Longer than the corresponding unit on the CBR954RR ( compared to ) the CBR1000RR's  longer swingarm made up 41.6 percent of its total wheelbase.

Accommodating the longer swingarm was another reason the CBR1000RR power plant shared nothing with the 954. Shortening the engine compared to the 954 meant rejecting the conventional in-line layout. Instead, engineers positioned the CBR1000RR's crankshaft, main shaft and countershaft in a triangulated configuration, with the countershaft located below the main shaft, dramatically shortening the engine front to back, and moving the swingarm pivot closer to the crankshaft. This configuration was first successfully introduced by Yamaha with the YZF-R1 model in 1998 and inspired superbike design in the following years.

Positioning this compact engine farther forward in the chassis also increased front-end weight bias, an effective method of making high-powered liter bikes less wheelie prone under hard acceleration. This approach, however, also provided very little space between the engine and front wheel for a large radiator. Engineers solved this problem by giving the RR a modest cylinder incline of 28°, and moving the oil filter from its frontal placement on the 954 to the right side of the 1000RR engine. This allowed the RR's center-up exhaust system to tuck closely to the engine.

2006–2007

The eighth generation RR (SC57) was introduced in 2006 and offered incremental advancements over the earlier model, and less weight. Changes for 2006 included:
 New intake and exhaust porting (higher flow, reduced chamber volume)
 Higher compression ratio (from 11.9:1 to 12.3:1)
 Revised cam timing
 More intake valve lift (from 8.9 mm to 9.1 mm)
 Double springs for the intake valves
 Higher redline (from 11,250rpm to 12,200rpm)
 Larger rear sprocket (from 41 to 42 teeth)
 New exhaust system
 New chassis geometry
 Larger  front brake discs but thinner at 
Larger  rear brake discs but thinner at 
 Revised rear suspension with new linkage ratios 135 mm
 New lighter swingarm
 Smaller, lighter rear caliper
 Revised front fairing design
The 2006 model carried over to the 2007 model year mostly unchanged except for color options.

2008 redesign
An all-new ninth-generation RR (SC59), the CBR1000RR was introduced at the Paris International Motorcycle Show on September 28, 2007 for the 2008 model year. The CBR1000RR was powered by an all-new  inline-four engine with a redline of 13,000 rpm. It had titanium valves and an enlarged bore with a corresponding reduced stroke. The engine had a completely new cylinder block, head configuration, and crankcase with lighter pistons. A new ECU had two separate revised maps sending the fuel and air mixture to be squeezed tight by the 12.3:1 compression ratio. Ram air was fed to an enlarged air box through two revised front scoops located under the headlamps.

Honda made a very focused effort to reduce and centralize overall weight. A lighter, narrower die-cast frame was formed using a new technique which Honda claimed allowed for very thin wall construction and only four castings to be welded together. Almost every part of the new bike was reengineered to reduce weight, including the sidestand, front brake hoses, brake rotors, battery, and wheels.

In order to improve stability under deceleration, a slipper clutch was added, with a center-cam-assist mechanism. The Honda Electronic Steering Damper was revised as well. Another significant change was the exhaust system, which was no longer a center-up underseat design. The new exhaust was a side-slung design in order to increase mass centralization and compactness while mimicking a MotoGP-style.

2009
On September 5, 2008, Honda announced the tenth generation of the RR as a 2009 model. The bike remained much the same, in terms of engine, styling, and performance. The only significant addition was the introduction of the optional factory fitted Combined ABS (C-ABS) system originally showcased on the CBR600RR Combined ABS prototype. New, lightweight turn signals were also added.

2010

On September 4, 2009, Honda announced the eleventh generation of the RR as a 2010 model. Honda increased the diameter of the flywheel for more inertia. This improved low-rpm torque and smoother running just off idle. The license plate assembly was redesigned for quicker removal when preparing the motorcycle for track use. The muffler cover was also redesigned for improved appearance.

2012
The twelfth-generation Fireblade celebrated its 20th anniversary, revised for 2012, featuring Showa's Big Piston suspension technology, Showa balance-free shock, further improved software for the combined ABS, new 12-spoke wheels, aerodynamic tweaks, an all LCD display and other minor updates.

2014

Retuned engine for additional power, modified rider position along with new windscreen. Also added a performance oriented "SP" variant.

2017 redesign

For 2017, with the 25th anniversary of the Fireblade, Honda has updated its flagship CBR with new bodywork and features such as throttle-by-wire and traction control for the first time that works with selectable ride modes. Some of the new features on the SP model are semi-active Öhlins Electronic Control suspension (S-EC), Brembo monobloc four-piston front brake calipers, titanium fuel tank and a 13:1 compression ratio. Also adding an even more exotic limited production "SP2" variant with Marchesini forged wheels and with larger valves of which 500 units will be sold.

2019
The CBR1000RR Fireblade received some electronic updates for 2019. The traction control is now separated from the wheelie control, meaning both systems can be controlled independently. The dashboard now has a three-position ‘W’ setting, alongside the Power, Engine Braking and Honda Selectable Torque Control (HSTC) traction settings. The ABS settings has also been tweaked, giving less intervention above  and giving 15% more deceleration. The ride-by-wire throttle motor is also enhanced, giving the throttle plates more quick reaction to the rider's inputs.

2020 redesign
For 2020, the CBR1000RR is updated with a new name (CBR1000RR-R), redesigned bodywork and new engine based on technologies used in RC213V MotoGP bike.

Awards
The CBR1000RR was awarded Cycle World's International Bike of the Year for 2008-09 by the world's moto-journal communities as well as journalists.
The 2009 CBR1000RR won the Best Sportbike of the Year Award in Motorcycle USA Best of 2009 Awards, having also won the over 750 cc open sportbike class in 2008.  The 2012 CBR1000RR won another Cycle World shootout, as well as a Motorcycle USA best street and track comparisons.

Various teams have won the Suzuka 8 Hours endurance race nine times between 2003 and 2014.

Specifications

See also
List of fastest production motorcycles by acceleration
Honda CBR150R
Honda CBR300R
Honda CBR600RR
Honda CBR900RR

References

External links

 2008 Honda CBR1000RR official U.S. site
 Official CBR1000RR press releases
 Honda's 20th Anniversary RR model history pages

CBR1000RR
Sport bikes
Motorcycles introduced in 2004

de:Honda Fireblade